Bass Generation is the fourth studio album by Swedish musician Basshunter. It was first released on 28 September 2009, a week after the album's lead single "Every Morning". The album reached No. 2 in New Zealand and No. 7 in South Africa.

Background 
In early 2009, Basshunter started the process of recording the album. A comment was posted on his official website in April that he was "back in the studio to do some work on the new album." On 1 July 2009, it was announced that Basshunter would be releasing a brand new single titled "Every Morning" on 21 September with the new album, Bass Generation, being released one week later on 28 September. On 1 September 2009, the official album artwork and track listing was posted on Hard2Beat.com. On 15 September, it was revealed on Basshunter's official Bebo profile that the album would also be released as a two-disc set.

He received a lot of requests to create new "Tetris" song so he recorded "Plane to Spain" which is one of his favourite songs from album. At first he thought of making it instrumental, but it wouldn't be that salable.

Release 
In early September 2009, before the album was released the song "Numbers" was released to the public as a free download via Basshunter's official Bebo profile. The album release date was eventually moved up a week for unknown reasons to 28 September 2009, along with the single "Every Morning", which was released on 21 September 2009.

Promotion 
To promote the album, the Basshunter Album Artwork Competition was set up on 10 August 2009, in which fans could design and upload their own cover art for the "Bass Generation" album to Basshunters Bebo profile. The winners artwork would be signed, framed and presented to them by Basshunter at the Bass Generation tour. The winning entry was revealed on 11 September 2009.

Bass Generation Tour 
Basshunter also set out on the Bass Generation Tour in October 2009 in support of the album. The 10 date UK tour was announced on 1 July 2009. Tickets went on sale 3 July 2009.

Tour dates 

 Source:

Singles 
 "Every Morning", was the first single released from the album. It was released on 21 September 2009. The song was first performed at the UK Dance Nation Tour in April 2009. The first radio play of the track was on the BBC Radio 1 Switch program on 19 July 2009. The song is about a former girlfriend of Basshunter's. It has so far reached the top 20 in the UK and New Zealand. Its accompanying music video was filmed on location in Majorca. It premiered on 12 August 2009.
 Before the album release, "Numbers" was confirmed to be the second single. But in November it was changed. "I Promised Myself", is the second single released from the album. The single was released on 30 November, the music video has already been released.
 According to a commercial from Hard2Beat, "Why" was set to be the third single. In April 2010 "Day & Night" was added to radio stations across the UK. In May 2010 it was announced that there will not be a third single from Bass Generation and a new song, which was named "Saturday" was released in July.

Reception 

Editor from Arbetarbladet said that "Every Morning" has wonderful lyrics and is unfortunately among the better on the album.

Track listing 

Notes
"Numbers" is not included on digital versions.

Charts

Weekly charts

Certifications

Release history

References

External links 
 

2009 albums
Basshunter albums
Ultra Records albums
Warner Music Sweden albums